Paul Renkert is a retired American soccer forward who played professionally in the North American Soccer League, Major Indoor Soccer League, American Soccer League.

Renkert graduated from Newport High School. In 1976, Renkert signed with the Seattle Sounders of the North American Soccer League. He spent the 1976 season on the reserve squad then played one game during the 1977 season. On March 30, 1979, Renkert joined the California Sunshine of the North American Soccer League. In the fall of 1980, he moved to the Denver Avalanche of the Major Indoor Soccer League.

References

External links

 NASL/MISL stats

1957 births
Living people
American soccer players
American Soccer League (1933–1983) players
California Sunshine players
Denver Avalanche players
Major Indoor Soccer League (1978–1992) players
North American Soccer League (1968–1984) players
Seattle Sounders (1974–1983) players
Soccer players from Washington (state)
Association football forwards